Graciela Ortiz Gonsález (born 29 November 1954) is a Mexican politician affiliated with the Institutional Revolutionary Party. She currently serves as Senator of the LXII Legislature of the Mexican Congress. She also served as Deputy during the LXI Legislature.

References

1954 births
Living people
People from Chihuahua City
Members of the Senate of the Republic (Mexico)
Members of the Chamber of Deputies (Mexico)
Women members of the Senate of the Republic (Mexico)
Women members of the Chamber of Deputies (Mexico)
Members of the Congress of Chihuahua
Institutional Revolutionary Party politicians
20th-century Mexican politicians
20th-century Mexican women politicians
21st-century Mexican politicians
21st-century Mexican women politicians
Politicians from Chihuahua (state)